Lagosta Field is an oil and gas field located in the Santos Basin of southeastern Brazil. The field was discovered in July 2003 and was operated by El Paso Corp. oil company, holding a 60% stake with Petrobras owning the other 40%. Later, the field passed to Petrobras as operator. The field, located next to the Merluza Field, the first discovery in the Santos Basin in 1979, started development in 2009.

See also 

 Campos Basin
 Tupi oil field

References

Bibliography 
 

Oil fields of Brazil
Santos Basin
Petrobras oil and gas fields